Banyo Airport  is a public use airport located near Banyo, Adamaoua, Cameroon.

See also
List of airports in Cameroon

References

External links 
 Airport record for Banyo Airport at Landings.com

Airports in Cameroon
Adamawa Region